Proserpine is an 1887 drame lyrique in four acts by Camille Saint-Saëns to a libretto by Louis Gallet after Auguste Vacquerie.

Roles 
 Proserpine (soprano)
 Angiola (soprano)
 Sabatino (tenor)
 Squarocca (baritone)
 Renzo (basse)
 Orlando (tenor)
 Ercole (baritone)
 Filippo (tenor)
 Gil (tenor)
 Une religieuse ‘a nun’
 Trois jeunes filles ‘three girls’
 Trois novices ‘three novices’
 Seigneurs, mendiants, religieuses, soldats ‘Lords, mendicants, nuns, soldiers’

Recordings 
Veronique Gens as Proserpine, Marie-Adeline Henry Angiola; Frédéric Antoun Sabatino; Andrew Foster-Williams Squarocca; Jean Teitgen Renzo; Mathias Vidal Orlando; Philippe-Nicolas Martin Ercole; Artavazd Sargsyan Filippo/Gil; Clémence Tilquin, a nun Munich Radio Orchestra Flanders radio choir Ulf Schirmer, Ediciones Singulares, sponsored Palazzetto Bru Zane 2016

References

External links

Operas
Operas by Camille Saint-Saëns
French-language operas
1887 operas
Proserpina